The 2022–23 season is FC Ararat-Armenia's 5th season in Armenian Premier League, whilst they will also play in the Armenian Cup and where knocked out of the 2022–UEFA Europa Conference League by Paide Linnameeskond.

Season events
On 8 June, Ararat-Armenia announced the signing of Gevorg Ghazaryan from Pyunik, with Arman Hovhannisyan joining the following day, also from Pyunik, and Vsevolod Ermakov signing from Ararat Yerevan on 10 June.

On 24 June, Ararat-Armenia announced the signing of Hugo Firmino from Pyunik}}

On 1 July, Ararat-Armenia announced that Styopa Mkrtchyan had returned from his loan spell with BKMA Yerevan.

On 4 July, Ararat-Armenia announced the signing of Agdon Menezes from Varzim, whilst Tenton Yenne signed from Noravank on 7 July.

On 10 July, Ararat-Armenia announced the signing of Hakob Hakobyan from Urartu, whilst Miloš Stamenković joined on 14 July from Akzhayik.

On 12 January, Ararat-Armenia announced the signings of Edgar Grigoryan and Taofiq Jibril.

On 16 January, Ararat-Armenia announced that Wbeymar and Agdon had joined Alashkert on loan for the remainder of the season.

On 18 January, Ararat-Armenia announced the signing of Amos Nondi from Dila Gori.

On 19 January, Ararat-Armenia announced that Romércio had left the club after his contract had expired.

On 6 February, Ararat-Armenia announced the signing of Colombian defender Carlos Pérez from Alianza Petrolera.

On 25 February, Ararat-Armenia announced the signing of Croatian defender Dragan Lovrić from Kryvbas Kryvyi Rih.

On 28 February, Styopa Mkrtchyan returned to BKMA Yerevan on loan for the remainder of the season.

On 4 March, Miloš Stamenković left Ararat-Armenia.

Squad

Out on loan

Transfers

In

Out

Loans out

Released

Friendlies

Competitions

Overall record

Premier League

Results summary

Results by round

Results

Table

Armenian Cup

UEFA Europa Conference League

Qualifying rounds

Statistics

Appearances and goals

|-
|colspan="16"|Players away on loan:

|-
|colspan="16"|Players who left Ararat-Armenia during the season:

|}

Goal scorers

Clean sheets

Disciplinary Record

References

FC Ararat-Armenia seasons
Ararat-Armenia
Ararat-Armenia